Idioctis is a genus of brushed trapdoor spiders that was first described by L. Koch in 1874.

Species
, it contains nine species:
Idioctis eniwetok Raven, 1988 – Marshall Is., Caroline Is.
Idioctis ferrophila Churchill & Raven, 1992 – New Caledonia
Idioctis helva L. Koch, 1874 (type) – Fiji
Idioctis intertidalis (Benoit & Legendre, 1968) – Madagascar, Seychelles, Mayotte
Idioctis littoralis Abraham, 1924 – Singapore
Idioctis marovo Churchill & Raven, 1992 – Solomon Is.
Idioctis talofa Churchill & Raven, 1992 – Samoa
Idioctis xmas Raven, 1988 – Australia (Christmas Is.)
Idioctis yerlata Churchill & Raven, 1992 – Australia (Queensland)

References

Barychelidae
Mygalomorphae genera